The 1914 Arkansas Razorbacks football team represented the University of Arkansas during the 1914 college football season. Earle T. Pickering was the team's head coach for his second and final season. The Razorbacks compiled a 3–6 record and were outscored by their opponents by a combined total of 206 to 96.

Schedule

Note, Arkansas states Ole Miss used an ineligible player and consider it to be a forfeit.

References

Arkansas Razorbacks
Arkansas Razorbacks football seasons
Arkansas Razorbacks football